Korucuk in Turkish means small forest and it may refer to

Korucuk a village in Anamur district of Mersin Province
Korucuk a village in Gülnar district of Mersin Province
Korucuk a village in the central district of Sinop Province
Korucuk, Pasinler
Korucuk, Seben